Saud Qasmi is a Pakistani film and TV actor, TV producer, and co-manager of a family-owned entertainment business JJS Productions which he operates with his wife, Javeria Saud.

Personal life
Saud was born in Karachi, Pakistan. He's the nephew of the famous qari and naat khawan Waheed Zafar Qasmi, and he's himself a hafiz-e-Quran.

On 25 December 2006, Saud married TV Actress Javeria Jalil, now known as Javeria Saud. They have a daughter named Jannat born in 2007, and a son named Ibrahim born in 2011.

Filmography

Awards
Saud won the Best Actor Award in 1996 for the film Hawain (1996).

Saud's Television Shows
 Ishq Ki Inteha (2009–10)  Geo TV
 Yeh zindagi hai
 Yeh kaise mohabbat hai
 Yehi hai zindgai
 Jeena sikha do humein
 Mohabbat zindagi hai (2017–present)

See also 
 List of Lollywood actors

References

External links
 

Year of birth missing (living people)
Living people
Pakistani male film actors
Nigar Award winners
Male actors from Karachi
Muhajir people